Circus della Morte, formerly the Bizzaro Future Circus, is North Texas' first performing circus sideshow.  They are currently based in Dallas.

Members

Current
Mr. N. Visible: Human pincushion and masochist
Nurse Narcissa: contortionist and masticator
Charlie Tips: juggler and human blockhead
Kennie: Wielder of Sharp Objects
Mike McNasty: concertina player
Dr. Skotch: master of ceremonies

Former
Bizzaro
Guillo Tina
Punk Rock Penguin
John Chaos
Spider
Wicked Jello
Abra Cadavra

External links
Official website
Myspace

Sideshows
Music of Denton, Texas